Kazimierz Tyszka (Kalisz, Poland, 1872 – 1951, London, UK) was Polish Minister of Railways, 1923–25, in Władysław Grabski's government.

References

1872 births
1951 deaths
Polish politicians